Anak Krakatoa is a volcanic island in Indonesia.  On 29 December 1927, Anak Krakatoa first emerged from the caldera formed in 1883 by the explosive volcanic eruption that destroyed the island of Krakatoa. There has been sporadic eruptive activity at the site since the late 20th century, culminating with a large underwater collapse of the volcano that caused a deadly tsunami in December 2018.  There has been subsequent activity since.  Due to its young age, the island is one of several in the area that are of interest to, and the subject of extensive study by, volcanologists.

History

Background 
After the cataclysmic eruption of Krakatoa in 1883, Krakatoa Island lost approximately two-thirds of its body on the northwest side, obliterating the peaks of Perbuwatan and Danan, and leaving only the southern half of the island, including the Rakata volcano, as the last remnant of the original island. The lost area became a shallow sea.

Regrowth

In early 1927 volcanic activity began to appear at the point located between where the former peaks of Mount Perboewatan and Mount Danan had been. This was a short-lived appearance of a small island that was sunk by sea waves within a week.  Several months later, volcanic activity began to create a more permanent land formation that, due to rain and waves, once again collapsed under the sea after its volcanic activity stopped. This process repeated several times during the next three years.  On 11 August 1930, the volcanic island permanently rose above sea level, and was locally named Anak Krakatau (or "Child of Krakatoa").  It has been the site of repeated eruptive episodes ever since.  Anak Krakatoa's highest point increased at an average rate of 7–9 meters per year through September 2018.

Geography

Anak Krakatoa is located in the Sunda Strait—between the islands of Java and Sumatra—in the Indonesian province of Lampung.  The volcano is contained within the Ujung Kulon National Park, and is part of the Pacific Ring of Fire.

Geology
In geologic terms, it has recently formed within the caldera of the Krakatoa volcanic eruption. The entire island comprises a Somma-stratovolcano system of the late Holocene epoch, and features a pyroclastic cone. The major rock-type components of Anak Krakatoa include Andesite, Dacite, and Basalt; with minor indications of Trachyte.

The island had reached a maximum elevation of  before its collapse during the 2018 eruptive event.

Volcanic activity
The volcano's most recent eruptive episode began in 1994. Quiet periods of a few days have alternated with almost continuous Strombolian eruptions since then. Hot gases, rocks, and lava were released in an eruption in April 2008. Scientists monitoring the volcano warned people to stay out of a  zone around the island.

On 6 May 2009, the Volcanological Survey of Indonesia raised the eruption alert status of Anak Krakatoa to Level 3. In January 2012, volcanologists at the University of Oregon warned that a tsunami caused by flank collapse of Anak Krakatoa was likely, as it had formed on the steep eastern slope of the large caldera formed by the 1883 explosive eruption.

2018 eruption and aftermath 

A new eruptive phase was observed starting in June 2018; and on 15 October 2018, Anak Krakatau had a strong Strombolian to weak Vulcanian eruption that sent lava bombs into the water.

An eruption of the volcano on 22 December 2018 caused a deadly tsunami, with waves up to five meters in height making landfall. On 31 December 2018, the disaster agency stated the tsunami's death toll was 437, with 14,059 injured. The tsunami affected more than 300 kilometers (186 mi) of coastline in Sumatra and Java and 40,000 people were displaced. This made the eruption the second deadliest volcanic eruption of the 21st century to date. Cone collapse—with tsunami generation—was considered a potential hazard immediately before the eruption. Scientists had modeled the possibility six years before the event, and had identified the western flank as the section of the volcano most likely to fail.

Following the December 2018 eruption, it was believed that the southwest sector of the volcano, including the summit, had collapsed during the eruption, triggering the tsunami. On 23 December, this was confirmed by satellite data and helicopter footage, with the main conduit seen erupting from underwater, producing Surtseyan-style activity.

Satellite radar observations showed that by 10 January 2019, the volcano had continued to form, with further eruptions beginning to re-model the remnant structure. The crater, which had become open to the sea immediately after the eruption, had a complete rim above sea level.  In May 2019, phreatomagmatic activity was observed around the newly reconstructed crater as the volcano continued to increase in height and remodel the areas destroyed in 2018.

2020 eruption 
Anak Krakatoa began erupting again on the morning of 10 April 2020. The eruption was largely magmatic with lava fountains visible. No widespread damage was reported, and the eruption ended several hours later.

2022 eruption 
Anak Krakatoa presented a minor eruption on 4 to 5 February 2022.  At 8:20 PM on 24 April 2022, Anak Krakatoa once again erupted, sending a massive plume of ash 3,157 metres (10,358 ft) above the sea level. The volcano had erupted 21 times in the first four months of 2022, with the 24 April eruption being the biggest. On 26 April, Meteorology, Climatology, and Geophysical Agency (BMKG) increased the alert level for Anak Krakatoa from level 2 to level 3. The agency warned of possible high waves and tsunami following any eruptive event.

See also 
 Krakatoa documentary and historical materials
 List of volcanic eruptions by death toll
 List of volcanoes in Indonesia

Notes

References

External links

Lampung
Krakatoa
Active volcanoes of Indonesia
Calderas of Indonesia
Subduction volcanoes
Submarine calderas
Islands of the Sunda Strait
Uninhabited islands of Indonesia
New islands